The 2014 CERH European Roller Hockey U-17 Championship was the 33rd edition of the CERH European Roller Hockey Juvenile Championship. It was held in Gujan-Mestras, France from 24 to 30 August 2014.

Group stage

Group A

24 August 2014

25 August 2014

26 August 2014

27 August 2014

28 August 2014

Group B

24 August 2014

25 August 2014

26 August 2014

27 August 2014

28 August 2014

Knockout stage

Championship

5th - 8th playoff

9th–10th playoff

Final standing

See also
 Roller Hockey
 CERH European Roller Hockey Juvenile Championship

References

European Roller Hockey Juvenile Championship
2014 in French sport
2014 in roller hockey
International roller hockey competitions hosted by France